The gorgeted woodstar (Chaetocercus heliodor) is a species of hummingbird in tribe Mellisugini of subfamily Trochilinae, the "bee hummingbirds". It is found in Colombia, Ecuador, and Venezuela.

Taxonomy and systematics

The gorgeted woodstar and several other species in genus Chaetocercus were  formerly placed in genus Acestrura but have been in their current position since the late 20th century. It has two subspecies, the nominate C. h. heliodor and C. h. cleavesi.

Description

It is the smallest woodstar, a group of species that collectively are among the world's smallest birds. Both sexes have a straight black bill. The nominate male is mostly dark metallic blue-green. It has a pinkish purple gorget that extends across the neck, a grayish line behind the eye, a grayish breast, and white spots on the flanks. The tail is forked, with very short central feathers and outer ones that are bare shafts. The nominate female's upperparts are bronzy green with a rufous rump. Its underparts are cinnamon-rufous and its rounded tail is cinnamon with a black bar near the end. Males of subspecies C. h. cleavesi are darker than the nominate, with a less purplish gorget and a shorter tail.

Distribution and habitat

The nominate subspecies of gorgeted woodstar is found in the Andes from Venezuela's Mérida state south through Colombia into western Ecuador. C. h. cleavesi is found in the Andes of northeastern Ecuador between Sucumbíos and Morona-Santiago provinces. The species inhabits semi-open to open landscapes such as the edges of humid forest, coffee plantations, and areas with some trees and shrubs; it occasionally visits the lower parts of the páramo.

Behavior

Movement

The gorgeted woodstar's movements, if any, are not known but seasonal elevational changes are thought likely.

Feeding

The gorgeted woodstar forages for nectar from vegetation's middle strata to the canopy; one important source is the flowers of Inga trees. It does not defend feeding territories, and because of its small size and slow bumblebee-like flight is sometimes able to feed in the territories of other hummingbirds. In addition to feeding on nectar, it captures small insects by hawking from a perch.

Breeding

At least in parts of Colombia, the gorgeted woodstar's breeding season extends from April to October. It builds a cup nest of soft plant material with lichens, leaf pieces, and small twigs on the outside. The nest is attached with spiderweb to a vertical or horizontal branch. No other information is known about its breeding phenology.

Vocalization

The gorgeted woodstar makes "a single dry 'chit', doubled 'chichit' or tripled 'chichichit'" calls while hovering or feeding.

Status

The IUCN has assessed the gorgeted woodstar as being of Least Concern. It has a fairly large range, and though its population size is not known it is believed to be stable. It is considered rare to locally common in various parts of its range but may be more common than thought because of its small size and inconspicuous behavior.

References

External links
Photo(called "Gorgetted"); Article sunbirdtours
Gorgeted Woodstar photo gallery VIREO

Further reading

gorgeted woodstar
Birds of the Colombian Andes
Birds of the Venezuelan Andes
Birds of the Ecuadorian Andes
gorgeted woodstar
gorgeted woodstar
Taxonomy articles created by Polbot